The Frith-Plunkett House is a historic house at 8th and Main Streets in Des Arc, Arkansas.  It is a well-proportioned two story wood-frame structure, with a gable roof, weatherboard siding, and a foundation of brick piers.  A Neoclassical two-story porch projects from the center of what is otherwise a typical I-house, giving it a distinctive Greek Revival character.  Built in 1858, it is the oldest standing residence in the city.

The house was listed on the National Register of Historic Places in 1982.

See also
National Register of Historic Places listings in Prairie County, Arkansas

References

Houses on the National Register of Historic Places in Arkansas
Greek Revival architecture in Arkansas
Houses completed in 1858
Houses in Prairie County, Arkansas
National Register of Historic Places in Prairie County, Arkansas
1858 establishments in Arkansas